Frederick Karl "Fritz" Nagy (January 3, 1924 – June 5, 1989) was an American former Basketball Association of America player. Drafted by the Pittsburgh Ironmen in the 1947 BAA draft, Fritz played for just one season, 1948–49, with the Indianapolis Jets.

Nagy played basketball at South High School in Akron, He attended college at North Carolina for one season, leading the Southern Conference with 201 points in the 1942–43 season. He then transferred to Akron, playing for the Zips from 1943 to 1947.

BAA career statistics

Regular season

References

External links

1924 births
1989 deaths
Akron Zips men's basketball players
All-American college men's basketball players
American men's basketball players
Indianapolis Jets players
North Carolina Tar Heels men's basketball players
Pittsburgh Ironmen draft picks
Professional Basketball League of America players
Shooting guards
Small forwards